Taxation in Oklahoma takes many forms. Individuals and corporations in Oklahoma are required to pay taxes or fee charges to both levels of government: state and local. Taxes are collected by the government to support the provisions of public services. The Oklahoma Constitution vested the authority to levy taxes with the Oklahoma Legislature while the Oklahoma Tax Commission is the primary Executive agency responsible for collecting taxes.

The most significant forms of taxation are income tax, sales tax, excise taxes, and property tax.

State Taxation

Income Taxes
Taxes based on income are imposed at the State level, both on individuals and corporations. Oklahoma first enacted an individual income tax in 1915 and then a corporate income tax in 1931. Income taxes are steadily increased as a major State revenue source since 1933 when the Oklahoma Constitution was amended to prohibit State-level taxation of property.

Income taxes are now the largest source of revenue for the State government, accounting for approximately 38% of total state revenue - 32% from individuals and 6% from corporations.

Tax Rate

Individuals
Oklahoma has adopted a progressive income tax for individuals, in which the tax rate increases as the amount of personal income increase.

Corporations
The corporate income tax rate is a flat tax of 4% for all corporations, regardless of earnings. When established in 1931, the corporate income tax was progressive but became flat in 1935.

Revenue Purpose
Both individual and corporate income taxes are earmarked by the Oklahoma Legislature to support specific state agencies and/or funds:

Sales and Use Tax
The State sales tax and use tax was first enacted in 1933 as a temporary one percent tax for the support of public schools. Two years later, the tax was renewed with revenues being deposited into the state General Fund. In 1939, the sales tax rate was increased to two percent with the revenues being used to fund public assistance programs. This remained unchanged until the 1980s when the revenues were redirected back to the General Fund. Additionally, throughout the 1980s, the tax rate was gradually increased from two percent to four percent. In 1990, the passage of the "Education Reform Act" increased the State sales tax rate to its present four and a half percent.

State sales taxes are now the second largest source of revenue for the State government, accounting for approximately 27q% of total state revenue.

Tax Rate
The "Oklahoma Sales Tax Code" imposes a 4.5% Statewide tax on the sale of all goods within the State. The State also levies a 4.5% Statewide tax on the use, storage, and consumption of goods bought out of State.

Revenue Purpose
Both the State sales and use taxes are earmarked by the Oklahoma Legislature to support specific state agencies and/or funds:

Gross Production Tax
The State levies a gross production tax on the removal of natural products from Oklahoma's land or water. The gross production tax was established in 1910 to tax the extraction of natural gas and oil. With the elimination of State-level property taxation, the gross production tax began an important source of State revenue. The current State gross production tax takes the form of an excise tax, with the amount of the tax based upon the sale price of oil and natural gas.

State sales taxes are the fourth largest source of revenue for the State government, accounting for approximately 6% of total state revenue.

Tax Rates
Oklahoma state law has imposed several taxes on the removal of natural resources of the State:

Revenue Purpose
The Oklahoma Legislature has earmarked the revenues from the gross production and petroleum excise tax to support various agencies and/or funds:

Motor Vehicle Taxes
The modern excise tax on motor vehicles was established in 2000. The motor vehicle tax assesses a three and one quarter percent tax on the sale price of all vehicles in the State, new and used. Taxes are collected by local motor license agents (or tag agents) under the supervision of the Tax Commission.

State motor vehicle excise taxes are the third largest source of revenue for the State government, accounting for approximately 7% of total state revenue.

Tax Rates
Oklahoma state law has imposed several taxes on motor vehicles of the State:

Revenue Purpose
The Oklahoma Legislature has provided that the excise tax on motor vehicles and boats and the registration fees for motor vehicles and boats are to be apportioned as follows:

All revenues generated from the Aircraft Excise Tax are directed towards the Aeronautics Commission Fund, which supports the operations of the Oklahoma Aeronautics Commission.

The Oversized Vehicle Fees are apportioned in the same manner as the motor vehicle taxes and fees on the first $1,216,000 collected each month. Any revenues collected in excess of that amount are deposited into the Weigh Station Improvement Fund, which is used to maintain and expand the State's Weigh stations.

Motor Fuel Taxes
In 1923, Oklahoma enacted its first State-level excise tax on motor fuels. The motor vehicle tax has since its enactment been the primary funding mechanize used for the construction and maintenance of State roads and bridges. Prior to the enactment of the fuel tax, the State played a limited role in building the State's transportation infrastructure, primarily overseeing the work conducted by local governments. The current motor fuel taxes are a set amount based upon the amount of fuel purchased and not a percentage of the sale price. The fuel taxes continue to be the State's primary source of funding for infrastructure spending, with a significant portion of the revenues being forwarded to local level government.

State motor fuel taxes account for approximately 5% of total state revenue.

Tax Rates
Oklahoma state law levies taxes on both gasoline and diesel motor fuels:

Revenue Purpose
Oklahoma state law levies taxes on both gasoline and diesel motor fuels:

Tobacco Taxes
The State levies taxes on cigarettes and other tobacco products. The State levies an excise tax on cigarettes, as well as various excise taxes on cigars and smoking and chewing tobacco. As Oklahoma is home to numerous Native American tribes, the State has entered into state-tribal tobacco compacts under which the tribes remit taxes to the State derived from the sale of tobacco products on Indian land.

State taxes on tobacco products account for approximately 4% of total state revenue.

Tax Rates
Oklahoma state law levies taxes on cigarettes as well as various other tobacco products:

Revenue Purposes

Insurance Tax
Oklahoma assesses a State level excise tax on insurance premiums paid across the State. The insurance tax is collected by the Oklahoma Insurance Department. While most of the insurance tax is deposited within the General Fund, the revenues also support the Insurance Department and provide revenues for the State's employee retirement systems.

Insurance premium taxes account for approximately 2% of total state revenue.

Tax Rate

Revenue Purpose
Revenues from insurance premium taxes are earmarked by the Oklahoma Legislature to support specific state agencies and/or funds. More than half of the revenues collected are used to support the State's public employee retirement funds, with the remainder allocated to the General Fund.

Alcohol Taxes
Oklahoma has enacted a number of taxes on alcoholic beverages. The alcoholic beverage tax on liquor is an excise tax varying in amount depending on the alcohol by volume of the drink and an excise tax of $11.25 on each barrel of low-alcohol beer sold. A special sales tax of 13.5% is levied on the sale of all mixed drinks.

State taxes on alcoholic beverage products account for approximately 1% of total state revenue.

See also
Oklahoma Tax Commission
Oklahoma state budget
Taxation in the United States

References

External links
Oklahoma Tax Commission website